Stygia is a genus of moths belonging to the family Cossidae.

Species
Stygia australis Latreille, 1804
Stygia hades Le Cerf, 1924
Stygia mosulensis Daniel, 1965
Stygia nilssoni Saldaitis & Yakovlev, 2008

References

 , 1990: A Phylogenetic study on Cossidae (Lepidoptera: Ditrysia) based on external adult morphology. Zoologische Verhandelingen 263: 1-295. Full article: .
 , 2011: Stygiinae Yakovlev, subfam. n., a new Subfamily of Palaearctic Carpenter-moths (Lepidoptera: Cossidae). Entomological Review 91 (4): 508-512.

Stygiinae
Cossidae genera